Nicholas Tandy (born 5 November 1984) is a professional British racing driver currently racing for Corvette Racing in the FIA World Endurance Championship in the 64 Corvette C8.R.  His major victories include the 2015 24 Hours of Le Mans, the 2015 Petit Le Mans, the 2018 24 Hours of Nürburgring and the 2020 24 Hours of Spa. He scored also class win at the 2014 24 Hours of Daytona and 2018, 2019, 2020 12 Hours of Sebring.

Career

Ministox
Born in Bedford, Tandy followed brother Joe's route on the motor racing ladder, by starting out as an eleven-year-old in short oval Ministox machinery, in 1996. Immediate success came to him, as he won the Midland region of Ministox. 1997 saw a shift to the East Anglian Ministox region, where Tandy ended as runner-up. 1998 saw Tandy finish as runner-up in the world championship, behind brother Joe and also finished third in the national championship. He would go two places better in 1999, as he claimed the Spedeworth points title. Tandy won four different championships in 2000. Winning the ORC Championship at RAF Bovingdon, he continued the success at Arlington, Eastbourne (Southern), and at Wimbledon Stadium (London), before retaining the Spedeworth points title.

Mini Se7ens
Continuing the Mini theme, Tandy moved into Mini Se7ens in time for the 2001 Winter Series. He ended up third in the championship, won eventually by Kelly Rogers. Tandy moved into the main series for 2002, but struggled to find form and eventually languished down in tenth in the overall championship standings. A second Winter Series campaign followed, and improved his 2001 position by one by finishing runner-up. He competed in two more seasons in the main championship, amassing four wins in 2003.

Formula Ford
After a year in the BRDC Single Seater Championship, which he dominated in 2005 (11 wins from 14 races) and earning a Scholarship from Silverstone, Tandy moved into the British Formula Ford Championship in 2006. Tandy had an impressive first season in the championship, finishing as runner-up in the standings, with 365 points. Although, he was over 150 points behind dominating champion Nathan Freke. Tandy had started out at the Raysport team but with his car lacking upgrades, decided to jump ship with four races to go and become the first driver for his brother's newly setup team. A win and a second place at both Thruxton and Castle Combe allowed Tandy to overhaul Peter Dempsey, Christian Ebbesvik and James Nash to achieve that runner-up position behind Freke. He then proceeded to win the 2006 Formula Ford Festival on the road, before a 10-second penalty was added post-race for a safety car misdemeanour, dropping him to fifth. He continued in the championship in 2007, but finished one place lower in the standings, finishing third overall. Tandy and James Nash were involved in a titanic battle for the runner-up spot (as Callum MacLeod finishing some 130 points clear of the pair), which was eventually settled by just twelve points. Tandy won six races throughout the season, and finished on the podium on ten other occasions. After his close call the previous year, Tandy won the Formula Ford Festival at the end of the season, but only after MacLeod was given a two-second penalty post-race.

Formula Palmer Audi
After his Formula Ford Festival win, Tandy signed a very late deal to compete in the Formula Palmer Audi Autumn Trophy, and in particular the Formula Palmer Audi Shootout. The Shootout guarantees a place on the shortlist for the McLaren Autosport BRDC Award for the driver who scores the most points over the course of the three-race weekend at Snetterton. Thanks to two wins, and a fourth (although the fourth was irrelevant due to best two scores), Tandy won the Shootout and was part of the shortlist. However, he would lose out to Stefan Wilson.

Formula Three
After two years in Formula Ford, Tandy moved into the highly competitive British Formula 3 Championship for the 2008 season. Driving for his brother's team and piloting the unfavourable Mygale chassis, Tandy started with three retirements. He steadily improved throughout the season, and recorded his first podium during the overseas round at Spa-Francorchamps, in support of the Spa 24 Hours. Two more podiums came towards the end of the season at Silverstone and Donington Park, as he ended up ninth overall, overtaking Max Chilton at the Donington finale. He also competed in the guest car in the Porsche Carrera Cup at Silverstone, winning the first race.

Tandy continued in the series in 2009, and also continued to use the Mygale chassis and Mercedes engines. With Ultimate Motorsport pulling out of the series, JTR became the de facto lead team for Mygale, with Tandy being touted as a championship contender. After a double podium at the Oulton Park opener, Tandy suffered a somewhat disappointing weekend at Silverstone with low points finishes. After his brother's death, the team vowed to carry on in both Formula Three and in Formula Ford. Eighteen days after his brother's death, Tandy scored his and the team's first win with a dominating performance at Rockingham. Having negotiated the first lap incident which took out rivals Daniel Ricciardo and Renger van der Zande, Tandy drove away from the field to win by 8.608 seconds from Henry Arundel and Adriano Buzaid. Tandy is also noted for his pace over a single lap, having recorded four fastest laps from the first eight races of the championship, and at one point, lay third in the standings.

After Carlo van Dam left Kolles & Heinz Union, Tandy was signed up to drive at the Norisring in the Formula Three Euroseries. The following weekend, Tandy signed a deal to compete in the rest of the Euroseries campaign, but a clause in the contract meant that he did not compete again in the rest of the British championship. Tandy left the team before the Dijon-Prenois rounds.

Porsche Carrera Cup Germany and Porsche Supercup
Tandy was then offered the opportunity to compete in the Porsche Carrera Cup Germany at the Dijon-Prenois rounds with Konrad Motorsport where on his debut with no testing, he finished 2nd.
Following this performance Tandy was given a drive with Konrad in Porsche Supercup at the Abu Dhabi round supporting Formula 1. He was again on the podium with a 2nd place.
Having impressed in the 2009 season finale, Tandy drove on a permanent basis for the German-based team in the Porsche Mobil 1 Supercup; he started the 2010 Porsche Supercup season with an excellent qualifying performance and was rewarded with a podium in the opening rounds, and Tandy swiftly went on to take his first Porsche Supercup win on 11 July 2010 at the British circuit, Silverstone GP, in superb fashion with a classic lights to flag victory. Tandy's full debut season ended with him putting in a strong challenge for the title, taking the fight with eventual winner René Rast, to the final race at the famous Autodromo Nazionale Monza. Tandy returned for a second season in 2011 but he failed to achieve his ambition of winning the title after only winning one race at Abu Dhabi and finishing 5th in the championship.
In the German Cup he came close to winning the championship in 2010 after winning five races but also finished two races outside the top fifteen and retired at the final round. He won the 2011 championship winning three races and finishing on the podium seven times.

International sports car racing
In 2012 Tandy started in various sports car racing series such as the American Le Mans Series, the ADAC GT Masters and the International GT Open. Together with Marco Holzer, his teammate at Manthey Racing, he became runner-up of the 2012 International GT Open season.  He won the Porsche Cup award for the best private Porsche racing driver.

Shortly after that, Tandy has been signed as the tenth Porsche works driver. His first official race was the 2013 24 Hours of Daytona Tandy won the GT class of the 2013 Petit Le Mans and resulted third at the 12 Hours of Sebring, driving for Team Falken Tire alongside Wolf Henzler and Bryan Sellers. He also won the GTC class at American Le Mans Series race at Laguna Seca with NGT Motorsport. Also, he won two races at the European Le Mans Series in the GTE class, ending third in the standings.

Tandy joined the Porsche factory team at the United SportsCar Championship for the 2014 season. He shared a Core Porsche 911 RSR in the GTLM class with Richard Lietz. He won the season-opening Rolex 24 at Daytona with Lietz and Patrick Pilet.

In 2015 he partnered Patrick Pilet in the United SportsCar Championship. He claimed four wins and a third-place finish, helping his teammate to win the drivers championship, as well as the teams championship and also overall win in 2015 Petit Le Mans with a Porsche 911 RSR of GTLM class.

Also in 2015, Tandy joined the Porsche LMP1 factory team at the 6 Hours of Spa-Francorchamps and 24 Hours of Le Mans, winning the French classic. The Brit also drove a KCMG Oreca Nissan at five rounds of the World Endurance Championship, helping the team to finish runner-up in the LMP2 standings.

In 2016, Tandy continued sharing a factory Porsche 911 with Pilet at the GT Le Mans class of the IMSA SportsCar Championship, scoring a class win at Long Beach and a second place at Austin.

The Brit returned to Porsche's LMP1 factory team for the 2017 FIA World Endurance Championship, where he scored multiple podiums but no wins.

As Porsche left sports prototype racing for 2018, Tandy returned to the IMSA SportsCar Championship, sharing the #911 car with Pilet. He earned two wins and ranked 7th in the GTLM class standings. In 2019 he was runner-up with three wins. Also in 2019, he finished third at the 24 Hours of Le Mans, with Earl Bamber as third driver.

Tandy continued the #911 GTLM car at the 2020 IMSA SportsCar Championship, now partnering with Frédéric Makowiecki. The duo got two wins and finished 5th in points. Also he scored a DNF at the 24 Hours of Le Mans with an Aurus LMP2.

Corvette Racing signed Tandy for the 2021 IMSA SportsCar Championship. Driving with Tommy Milner, he claimed four wins and finished runner-up in the GTLM class, behind their teammates.

In 2022, the driver continued sharing a factory Corvette with Milner, but in the FIA World Endurance Championship. He got a win and two runner-ups, and was 6th in the GTE drivers ranking.

Tandy returned to the Porsche for the 2023 season to drive a Porsche 963 prototype.

Personal life
Tandy from Pavenham, Bedfordshire now resides in neighbouring village Felmersham with his wife and 2 children. He was educated at the local state schools: Pinchmill Lower School in Felmersham, Lincroft Middle School in Oakley and Sharnbrook Upper School and Community College in Sharnbrook. Nick's brother Joe died in a road traffic accident in Bromham, Bedfordshire on 13 May 2009. Nick drove for his late brother's team, Joe Tandy Racing, from 2006 until his Euroseries deal in mid-2009.

Racing record

Complete Formula 3 Euro Series results
(key) (Races in bold indicate pole position; races in italics indicate fastest lap)

Complete Porsche Supercup results
(key) (Races in bold indicate pole position) (Races in italics indicate fastest lap)

 As a guest driver Tandy was ineligible for championship points.

Complete 24 Hours of Le Mans results

Complete British GT Championship results
(key) (Races in bold indicate pole position) (Races in italics indicate fastest lap)

Complete FIA World Endurance Championship results

Complete IMSA SportsCar Championship results
(key) (Races in bold indicate pole position) (Races in italics indicate fastest lap)

† Non-points event.
* Season still in progress.

References

External links
 Nick Tandy at the Porsche official website
 Nick Tandy at the IMSA WeatherTech Championship website
 Nick Tandy at the American Le Mans Series website
 Career statistics from Driver Database

English racing drivers
1984 births
Living people
Formula Ford drivers
British Formula Three Championship drivers
Formula Palmer Audi drivers
Formula 3 Euro Series drivers
24 Hours of Daytona drivers
24 Hours of Le Mans drivers
24 Hours of Le Mans winning drivers
Rolex Sports Car Series drivers
British GT Championship drivers
Porsche Supercup drivers
American Le Mans Series drivers
People educated at Sharnbrook Academy
European Le Mans Series drivers
International GT Open drivers
Blancpain Endurance Series drivers
ADAC GT Masters drivers
WeatherTech SportsCar Championship drivers
FIA World Endurance Championship drivers
24 Hours of Spa drivers
Porsche Carrera Cup GB drivers
Sportspeople from Bedford
People from Pavenham
Corvette Racing drivers
KCMG drivers
Porsche Motorsports drivers
G-Drive Racing drivers
Kolles Racing drivers
Rowe Racing drivers
Walker Racing drivers
Nürburgring 24 Hours drivers
Team Penske drivers
Porsche Carrera Cup Germany drivers